Arthur C. Burris (April 7, 1924 – September 19, 1993) was an American basketball player.

He played collegiately for the University of Tennessee.

He was selected by the Fort Wayne Pistons in the third round of the 1950 NBA draft.

He played for the Pistons (1950–51) and Milwaukee Hawks (1951–52) in the National Basketball Association (NBA) for 74 games.

External links

1924 births
1993 deaths
Fort Wayne Pistons draft picks
Fort Wayne Pistons players
Milwaukee Hawks players
Basketball players from Nashville, Tennessee
Tennessee Volunteers basketball players
American men's basketball players
Small forwards